Ngangom Bala Devi (born 2 February 1990) is an Indian women's footballer who plays as a forward for Odisha FC and the India women's national football team.

Club career
Born in Manipur, Devi grew up playing the game with mainly boys. She was a part of the Manipur U-19 team that took part in the Under-19 Women's Championship in Assam in 2002. After the tournament she was declared the best player of the tournament. She was awarded the same title the next year in 2003. She also earned top-scorer awards at the under-17 level for her state. Eventually, Devi went on to represent the Manipur Senior Women's Football Team in the Senior Women's National Football Championship. She was very influential in her state, winning the women's football championship in 2014, scoring a brace as Manipur defeated Odisha in the final 3–1. This was Manipur's first championship since 2010 and their 17th overall. While playing with Manipur, Devi was teammates with India captain and AIFF Women's Player of Year, Oinam Bembem Devi. She finished the tournament scoring 29 goals in seven matches.

During the 2015 National Games of India, Devi represented her state as they won the gold medal. She scored the equalizer in the final against Odisha to make it 1–1 at the Corporation Stadium. The team went on to win the match 4–2 on penalties.

In 2014, Devi signed a contract with New Radiant WSC of Maldives in the FAM Women's Football Championship alongside players Oinam Bembem Devi and Lako Phuti Bhutia.

She played inaugural season of  Indian Women's League 2016–17 with Manipur Police Sports Club in qualifying round and in Final Round played with  Eastern Sporting Union. In 2017–18 IWL 2nd season she joined  KRYPHSA and in 2018–19 IWL 3rd season   she re-joined  Manipur Police Sports Club.

In January 2020, Devi signed a professional contract of 18 months with Scottish Women's Premier League club Rangers, making her one of the few Indian women to become a professional footballer abroad. On 6 December 2020, she became the first Indian woman to score in a professional football league in Europe by netting for the Rangers, as they won against Motherwell by 9–0. An ankle injury ruled her out for the rest of the matches and she later parted ways with the club.

In December 2022, Devi moved to Spain along with Elangbam Panthoi Chanu, and underwent training cum trial stint at Spanish Segunda Federación club Málaga.

International career
Devi's first tournament with the national team was at the under-17 level in 2005. She has represented India at the senior level since 2005. She also represented the India women's under-19 side in 2006 and 2007. She was a part of the India team that took part in the first women's SAFF Championship in 2010. On 13 December 2010 she scored five goals in India's opening match of the tournament against Bhutan as India won 18–0. India went on to win the tournament, defeating Nepal 1–0.
She scored total 8 goals in 5 matches.

Despite being a part of the 2010 winning team, Devi was not included in the India squad that won the tournament again in 2012. She did return to the team for the 2014 AFC Women's Asian Cup qualifiers in May 2013 but India failed to qualify.

On 27 October 2014, it was announced that Devi was selected into the India squad that was to participate in the 2014 SAFF Women's Championship, her first SAFF Championship since 2010. She started the tournament in fantastic form as she scored four goals in the opening match against Maldives. Her form continued into the next match against Bangladesh as she scored a brace in a 5–1 victory for India. Devi then scored five more goals in the final group stage match against Afghanistan on 17 November. She finished the group stage with eleven goals from three matches.

During the semi-final against Sri Lanka Devi scored only once in a 5–0 thrashing. However, in the final, Devi managed to find the net four times as India defeated Nepal 6–0 to claim their third straight SAFF Championship crown.

Devi finished the 2014 SAFF Championship with sixteen goals in only five matches. Due to her performance in the tournament, Devi was awarded the Women's Player of the Year award by the All India Football Federation.
Also awarded in the next year 2015 Indian Women's Player of the Year. In 2016 South Asian Games she scored 3 goals in 5 matches. She also captained India women's national football team in 2016 SAFF Women's Championship. She also clinched the title first time as a captain.

Personal life
While a semi-professional footballer in India, Devi also worked as a policewoman for the Manipur Police. She was promoted to Inspector rank following her impressive performance in football for Rangers. She completed her education at the Oinam Thambal Marik College.

Career statistics

International goals

Honours

India
 SAFF Women's Championship: 2010, 2014, 2016
 South Asian Games Gold medal: 2010, 2016, 2019

Eastern Sporting Union
 Indian Women's League: 2016–17

Manipur
 Senior Women's National Football Championship: 2006–07, 2007–08, 2008–09, 2013–14, 2019–20
 National Games Gold medal: 2022

New Radiant WSC
FAM Women's Football Championship: 2015

Individual
 Indian Women's League Top Scorer: 2017–18, 2018–19
 AIFF Women's Player of the Year (3): 2014, 2015, 2020–21
 AFC International Player of the Week (2): December 2020, May 2021
 FAM Women's Football Championship Best Player: 2015
 FAM Women's Football Championship Top Scorer: 2015 (with 25 goals)

See also
 List of Indian football players in foreign leagues
 List of Indian Women's League hat-tricks

References

External links 

 
 Player profile at All India Football Federation

1990 births
Living people
Indian women's footballers
Women's association football forwards
Footballers from Manipur
India women's international footballers
India women's youth international footballers
Footballers at the 2014 Asian Games
Sportswomen from Manipur
South Asian Games gold medalists for India
South Asian Games medalists in football
Asian Games competitors for India
Eastern Sporting Union players
Kryphsa F.C. Players
Rangers W.F.C. players
Indian expatriate women's footballers
Indian expatriate sportspeople in the United Kingdom
Expatriate women's footballers in Scotland
Expatriate women's footballers in the Maldives
Scottish Women's Premier League players
Indian Women's League players
Odisha FC Women players